The Lamb Creek School, in Bonner County, Idaho near the city of Priest River, Idaho, was listed on the National Register of Historic Places in 1999.

It is a rustic one-story peeled log building built on United States Forest Service land in 1934 by a Civilian Conservation Corps battalion, to serve the increasing number of year-round residents in the area. Its gable front faces west.  It served as a school until 1961, when it was consolidated into the Priest River School District. It was used as a teacherage thereafter, until 1974, then converted to become the Priest Lake Library.  In 1995 the U.S. Forest Service transferred the parcel to a private owner, and it was to be  deeded to the Library Board in 1998.

References

Log buildings and structures
Schools in Idaho
Rustic architecture in Idaho
National Register of Historic Places in Bonner County, Idaho
Buildings and structures completed in 1934
1934 establishments in Idaho